"Schools of Japanese tea" refers to the various lines or "streams" of Japanese tea ceremony. The word "schools" here is an English rendering of the Japanese term .

There are three historical households dedicated to developing and teaching the style of tea ceremony developed by Sen no Rikyū, the 16th century tea master whom they are directly descended.

Rikyū's natural son, Sen no Dōan, took over as head of the Sakaisenke after his father's death, but the Sakaisenke soon disappeared as Dōan had no offspring or successor. The school named  is not descended by blood from the Sen family; its founder, Kawakami Fuhaku (1716–1807), became a tea master under the 7th generation head of the Omotesenke line, and eventually set up a tea house in Edo (Tokyo), where he devoted himself to developing the Omotesenke style of tea ceremony in Edo.

The  arose from the fact that three of the four sons of Genpaku Sōtan (Sen no Rikyū's grandson) inherited or built a tea house, and assumed the duty of passing forward the tea ideals and tea methodology of their great-grandfather, Sen no Rikyū. Kōshin Sōsa inherited  and became the head of the Omotesenke line; Sensō Sōshitsu inherited  and became  of the Urasenke line; and Ichiō Sōshu built  and became  of the Mushakōjisenke line. The names of these three family lines came about from the locations of their estates, as symbolized by their tea houses: the family in the front, the family in the rear, and the family on Mushakōji Street.

The  have historically championed this manner of tea.

As opposed to the  manner of tea ceremony, another style of tea ceremony, called  (also referred to as ) exists, the name referring to the manner of tea ceremony practiced by members of the warrior class mainly during the Edo period. Generally, tea ceremony teachers were given the responsibility for teaching this style, but there were some  who themselves possessed deep knowledge of tea ceremony.

Some of the main  styles are the Uraku, Sansai, Oribe, Enshū, Ueda Sōko, Sekishū, Chinshin, Fumai, Ogasawara (Ogasawara family), and Oie (Ando family).

Current schools

 (founder: Anrakuan Sakuden, 1554–1642)
 (founder: Matsura Chinshin, 1622–1703, who was magistrate of Hizen Hirado, present-day Hirado in Nagasaki Prefecture).The school takes after the "warrior-house style of tea" that was promoted by the  Katagiri Sekishū. The school is also known as the Sekishū-ryū Chinshin-ha (Chinshin branch of the Sekishū school).
 (founder: Kawakami Fuhaku, 1716–1807)
 (founder: Kobori Masakazu, also known as Kobori Enshū, 1579–1647). One of the foremost disciples of Furuta Oribe, Kobori Enshū was tasked as the official tea instructor for the second and third  of the Tokugawa, Hidetada and Iemitsu.
 (also known as Sekishū-ryū Sōgen-ha; see Sekishū-ryū below)
 (founder: Kawakami Fuhaku). This school, also called the Omotesenke Fuhaku-ryū, evolved after the death of Kawakami Fuhaku, when this faction split from the Edosenke school that he had founded.
 (founder: Hayami Sōtatsu, 1727–1809, who learned tea under the 8th Urasenke , Yūgensai, and was allowed by him to found a school of his own in Okayama)
 (The word "Higo" refers to present-day Kumamoto Prefecture;  means "old school").One of the schools of tea traditionally followed by members of the old Higo domain, it is considered to be faithful to Sen no Rikyū's tea style, and is somewhat-literally called tea of the "old school". The school has been led by three families, and therefore is divided into the following three branches:

 (founder: Kobori Masakazu (Kobori Enshū), 1579–1647, and passed down through Enshū's brother Kobori Masayuki, 1583–1615) Grand Master XVI, Kobori Soen currently runs the school.

 (founder: Matsuo Sōji, 1677–1752, great grandson of a close disciple of Sen no Sōtan who had the same name, Matsuo Sōji). The founder of the Matsuo school hailed from Kyoto and learned tea under the 6th Omotesenke , Kakukakusai. He later settled in Nagoya, where the Matsuo school is centered. A number of the successive Matsuo-ryū  in history have apprenticed under the "reigning" Omotesenke .

 (founder: Furuichi Tanehide/In'ei, 1439–1505, a warrior and devout Buddhist of Nara). Together with his brother, Furuichi Tanehide became a tea ceremony disciple of Murata Shukō, who is considered the "father" of the  style.The Furuichis served as  experts for the Ogasawara family, lords of the Kokura fief. They lost their position with the Ogasawaras when the feudal system was abolished, but the Ogasawara's continued to support their . The present head of the Ogasawara  is Ogasawara Nagamasa,the 33rd generation in his family, once lords of the Kokura fief.
 (founder: the feudal lord Andō Nobutomo, 1671–1732). The school traces its roots to Sen no Rikyū, and from Rikyū as follows: Hosokawa Sansai, Ichio Iori, Yonekitsu Michikata (1646–1729), and then Andō Nobutomo. In the Edo period, the Tokugawa  allowed the Andō family the right to conduct official celebratory ceremonies, and the family was known as etiquette authorities.
  (founder: Furuta Shigenari, also known as Furuta Oribe). According to the Japanese tea historian Tsutsui Hiroichi, after the death of Sen no Rikyū, his  follower Furuta Oribe succeeded him as the most influential tea master in the land.Oribe was  officer for the second Tokugawa , Tokugawa Hidetada, and had a number of notable  disciples, foremost of whom was Kobori Enshū. With the Meiji Restoration in the late 19th century, and the family's consequent loss of its hereditary position, the 14th-generation family head, Furuta Sōkan, went to the new capital, Tokyo, to attempt to reestablish the Oribe school of tea. Today, Kyūshū and especially Ōita have the highest concentration of followers of this school.

 (founded in the Shōwa era by Takaya Sōhan (1851–1933)).
. The school developed by the  Katagiri Sadamasa (also known as Katagiri Sekishū) (1605–1673), nephew of Katagiri Katsumoto and second-generation lord of the Koizumi Domain. Sekishū was chanoyu teacher to the fourth Tokugawa , Tokugawa Ietsuna, and his  style therefore became popular among the feudal ruling class of Japan at the time.
 (see Chinshin-ryū above)
 (founder: the  Matsudaira Harusato, also known as Matsudaira Fumai, 1751–1818).
 (founder: the Rinzai Zen sect priest Ikei Sōetsu, 1644–1714, founder of the Kōgen'in sub-temple at Tōkaiji temple in Tokyo). He studied  under Katagiri Sekishū. Furthermore, the Ikei-ha  style that spread among people in Tokyo was referred to as 'Edo Ikei', and that which spread among people in the Echigo (present-day Niigata Prefecture) region was referred to as 'Echigo Ikei'.

 (founder: Fujibayashi Sōgen, 1606–1695, chief retainer of the  Katagiri Sekishū).

 (founder: Yamada Sōhen, 1627–1708, one of the four close disciples of Sen no Sōtan)
 (founder: Kanamori Sōwa, also known as Kanamori Shigechika, 1584–1656)

 (founder: Niinuma Chinkei, who was a follower of Yamaoka Tesshū, 1836–1888)
 (founder: Oda Nagamasu [Urakusai])
 (founder: Yabunouchi Kenchū Jōchi, 1536–1627, who, like Sen no Rikyū, learned  from Takeno Jōō)
 (founder: Fujimura Yōken, 1613–1699, one of the four close disciples of Sen no Sōtan)

References

External links
Chinshin-ryū official website (Japanese)
Edosenke official website (Japanese)
Enshū-ryū official website
Hayami-ryū official website (Japanese)
Kobori Enshū-ryū official website
Mushakōjisenke official website
Omotesenke official website
Sansō-ryū official website (Japanese)
Sōhen-ryū official website
Ueda Sôko-ryū official website
Urasenke official website
Yabunouchi official website (Japanese)
Uraku-ryū official website (Japanese)
Undenshindō-ryū on Japanese Wikipedia 

Chadō